Gur-e Bizhan (also Romanized as Gūr-e Bīzhan; also known as Gūr Bīzān and Gūr-e Bīzan) is a village in Maskun Rural District, Jebalbarez District, Jiroft County, Kerman Province, Iran. At the 2006 census, its population was 95, in 24 families.

References 

Populated places in Jiroft County